Darden may refer to:

People
Christine Darden (born 1942), American mathematician and engineer
Christopher Darden (born 1956), American lawyer
Colgate Darden (1897–1981), American congressman, governor, and University of Virginia president
George Darden (born 1943), American politician
Geraldine Claudette Darden (born 1936), African-American mathematician
Jaelon Darden (born 1999), American football player
Jimmy Darden (1922–1994), American professional basketball player and coach
Joshua Darden (born 1979), American typeface designer
Mills Darden (1798–1857), American who was one of the largest people in history
Ollie Darden (born 1944), American retired professional basketball player
Paul Darden (born 1968), American poker player
Thom Darden (born 1950), American retired National Football League player
Thomas Darden (1900–1961), 37th governor of American Samoa and US Navy captain
Tony Darden (born 1957), American retired sprinter
Tony Darden (American football) (born 1975), American National Football League player 
Severn Darden (1929–1995), American comedian and actor
Stephen Heard Darden (1816–1902), American politician and Confederate politician and officer
Willie Darden (1933–1988), American man executed in Florida
Darden Hamilton (born 1956), American politician
Darden Smith (born 1962), American singer-songwriter

Other uses
Darden, Tennessee, United States, an unincorporated community and census-designated place
University of Virginia Darden School of Business, a graduate school
Darden Field, home stadium for the Colorado School of Mines baseball teams
Darden Hotel (Hamilton, North Carolina), on the National Register of Historic Places
City Hotel (Marthaville, Louisiana), also known as "Hotel Darden", on the National Register of Historic Places
Darden Restaurants, a restaurant management company